Pawtucket may refer to:

 Pawtucket, Rhode Island
 Pawtucket Falls (Massachusetts), Lowell, Massachusetts
 Pawtucket tribe
 2 ships named USS Pawtucket
 Pawtucket Brewery, fictional brewery on the television series Family Guy